NA-35 may refer to:

NA-35 (Bannu), a constituency of the National Assembly of Pakistan
North American NA-35, training aircraft designed by North American Aviation
NA35 experiment, a particle physics experiment that took place at CERN between 1983 and 1999
 Sodium-35 (Na-35 or 35Na), an isotope of sodium